Calaveras Big Tree National Forest, in the  Sierra Nevada,  was established in California on May 11, 1954 with  to protect a grove of Giant Sequoias, although it had been authorized since February 18, 1909.

Combined
Calaveras Big Tree National Forest was the smallest unit in the United States National Forest system, and was administratively combined with the Stanislaus National Forest.

Transfer
In 1990 it was proposed that the federal lands be transferred to the State of California to be included in the adjoining Calaveras Big Trees State Park.

References

text from Davis, Richard C., ed. Encyclopedia of American Forest and Conservation History. New York: Macmillan Publishing Company for the Forest History Society, 1983. Vol. II, pp. 743-788. - from the Forest History Society website

External links
Forest History Society website
Listing of the National Forests of the United States and Their Dates 

Former National Forests of California
History of the Sierra Nevada (United States)
Protected areas of Calaveras County, California